Mirco Severini (born 21 April 1997) is an Italian football player. He plays for AC Vigasio.

Club career
He made his Serie B debut for Cesena on 26 March 2016 in a game against Latina.

References

External links
 
 

1997 births
People from Iesi
Sportspeople from the Province of Ancona
Living people
Italian footballers
Association football forwards
A.C. Cesena players
Ravenna F.C. players
S.S. Juve Stabia players
Serie B players
Serie C players
Serie D players
Footballers from Marche